Out in the Fields: The Very Best of Gary Moore is a compilation album by Gary Moore. Released in 1998, the album encompasses a part of Moore's immense career from 1982 to 1992, focusing predominantly on the hard rock albums Moore released during that period. As well as the regular 1-disc version, a 2-CD limited edition was also released; the second disc contains several live and studio B-sides, a non-album single and a single remix.

Track listing

References 

1998 greatest hits albums
Gary Moore compilation albums
Virgin Records compilation albums